Eurytides dioxippus is a species of butterfly found in the Neotropical realm.

Subspecies
E. d. dioxippus - Panama to Colombia
E. d. marae (Racheli, Bollino & Sala, 1990) - south-western Venezuela: Tachira, Barinas
E. d. diores (Rothschild & Jordan, 1906) - Colombia, Ecuador: Napo, Peru, Bolivia: Mapiri
E. d. lacandones (Bates, 1864), the thick-border kite swallowtail - south-western Mexico: Veracruz, eastern Chiapas, Guatemala to Costa Rica, western Panama. Often sold to collectors.

Description
Wings on the upper surface with common green-yellow triangular area; forewing with vestiges of costal bands; hindwing with 2 red spots at the anal angle. Very common in Bogota-collections; Valleys of the Gauca, Magdalena and Meta Rivers, at moderate elevations.

Status
Restricted range but common and not threatened

Further reading
D'Abrera, B. (1981). Butterflies of the Neotropical Region. Part I. Papilionidae and Pieridae. Lansdowne Editions, Melbourne, xvi + 172 pp.
D'Almeida, R.F. (1965). Catalogo dos Papilionidae Americanos. Sociedade Brasileira de Entomologia. São Paulo, Brasil.
Rothschild, W. and Jordan, K. (1906). A revision of the American Papilios. Novitates Zoologicae 13: 411-752. online (and as pdf) (Facsimile edition ed. P.H. Arnaud, 1967).

References

External links
Butterflies of the Americas dioxippus images
Butterflies of the Americas lacandones images

Eurytides
Butterflies described in 1856